Hanglip (Afrikaans for hanging lip, Venda: Songozwi'), thavha ya VhaDzanani is a prominent mountain peak near Louis Trichardt, South Africa. It is situated in the Vhembe District of Limpopo in the central Soutpansberg range. The peak with radar station, at 1,719 meters a.s.l., forms a conspicuous landmark visible from the town and the N1 national road.

Hanglip mountain is situated in the 354 hectare Hanglip Forest Reserve within the Hanglip State Forest. The state forest contains commercial pine plantations, protected natural forest and bushveld. The pine plantations are harvested in 30 to 40 year cycles for construction wood.

Geologically the mountain consists of tilted layers of the Karoo succession including glacial till deposits. Red quartzite deposits and grey andesite lava intrusions are also present.

Songozwi was the VhaVenda area, under the VhaDzanani clan and their Chiefs, and later joined by the Mphephu/Ramabulana clan. The VhaDzanani clan have their sacred site in mount Songozwi, while the Ramabulana clan bury their chiefs there at a place or hill called Luatame. The whole region was Dzanani (named after the VhaDzanani) until 1946. This is because Songozwi was made a white-only area after 1913. Vhavenda were then evicted from this fertile area, the last group of Vhavenda left the area around the 60s. Eviction started around Schoemansdal after the 1898/9 Vhavenda - boer War. The boer were led by general Piet Joubert.

As safeguard against further attacks, Fort Botha was established under Hanglip some kilometers southwest of Mphephu's kraal. The ruins of the fort are currently off limits, being situated near graves of the Singos and the sacred site of vhaDzanani on the other side.

The town of Trichardtsdorp was established after the conflict.

The Hanglip Forest Reserve is a protected area in the zone of the mountain.
Hikers can arrange to overnight in the Hanglip trail hut east of the peak, and motorists can visit a picnic site against its southern slope.

See also
List of castles and fortifications in South Africa

References

External links
The Soutspanberg Hiking Trail

Mountains of South Africa
Climbing areas of South Africa
Landforms of Limpopo